Michael Henne (born December 13, 1961) was a member of the Ohio House of Representatives, serving the 40th District from 2011-2019.

Career
After graduating from Miami University, Henne went on to found Boord-Henne Insurance Agency where he has worked since 1987.

Ohio House of Representatives
When Representative Seth Morgan decided to seek the office of Ohio Auditor, Henne entered a crowded primary to replace him. In the Republican primary, he faced Butler Township Trustee Joe Ellis. Ellis was originally the party favorite, but due to a fight which broke out among Ellis at a local bar, the party support turned to Henne. In the end, Henne defeated Ellis handily, by almost 4,300 votes. In the general election, Democrats fielded well-known school board member Carl Fisher in an effort to take a pick-up from Republicans.  In the end, Henne defeated Fisher easily, by about 12,000 votes.

Henne was sworn into office for his first term on January 3, 2011. Currently, Henne is on the committees of Economic and Small Business Development, Education, Financial Institutions, Housing, and Urban Development, and Insurance.

In 2012, Henne won reelection with 54.46% of the vote over Democrat Carl Fisher.

Electoral history

References

External links
The Ohio House of Representatives: Representative Michael Henne (R-Brookville) official site
Michael Henne for State Representative campaign website

Living people
1961 births
Miami University alumni
Republican Party members of the Ohio House of Representatives
21st-century American politicians
People from Clayton, Ohio
People from Brookville, Ohio